This is a list of members of the Tasmanian Legislative Council between 1951 and 1957. Terms of the Legislative Council did not coincide with Legislative Assembly elections, and members served six year terms, with a number of members facing election each year.

Elections

Members

Notes
  On 29 July 1951, Arthur Grounds, the Labor member for Launceston, died. His widow Lucy Grounds won the resulting by-election on 29 September 1951.
  On 19 June 1954, Mervyn Lakin, the member for Mersey, died just 1 month and 11 days after being elected, becoming one of the shortest serving members in the Council's history. Hector McFie won the resulting by-election on 4 September 1954.

Sources
 
 Parliament of Tasmania (2006). The Parliament of Tasmania from 1856

Members of Tasmanian parliaments by term
20th-century Australian politicians